The Story of Bensurdatu is an Italian fairy tale collected by Laura Gonzenbach in Sicilianische Märchen. Andrew Lang included it in The Grey Fairy Book.

Synopsis

A king and queen had three daughters, and did everything to make them happy.  One day, the princesses asked to go on a picnic, and so they did.  When they were done eating, the princesses wandered about the garden, but when they stepped across a fence, a dark cloud enveloped them.  After a time, the King and Queen called for them, and then searched for them when the girls did not answer their calls.  The king proclaimed that whoever brought the princesses back could marry one, and would become the next king.  Two generals set out in search, but having spent all their money without finding the princesses, were forced to work as servants to repay an innkeeper for the food and drink he had given them.

A royal servant, Bensurdatu, set out, despite the king's unwillingness to lose a faithful servant as well as his daughters and his generals.  He found the inn with the generals and paid their debt.  The three of them traveled together.  In the wilderness, they found a house and begged for a place to stay for the night.  The old woman there told them that the king's daughters were taken by a thick cloud, and that two were the prisoners of giants and the third of a serpent with seven heads, all at the bottom of a river.  The generals wanted to return home to the King, but Bensurdatu was firm.

They went on until they reached the river.  The older general insisted on going first, because he was the oldest.  They lowered him on a rope, and gave him a bell to ring when he wanted to be pulled back up; he quickly lost his courage and rang it.  The second general fared the same.  Then they lowered Bensurdatu.  He came to a hall where a giant slept, and the princess stood before him.  The princess had him hide, and told the giant that he did not smell a man when he stirred from his sleep. She then had Bensurdatu cut off the giant's head.  The princess gave Bensurdatu a golden crown.  She showed him the door to the next giant, where he killed him as he had killed the first, and the second princess also gave him a golden crown.  He went on to the seven-headed serpent; he had to kill it while it was awake, but he took off its heads.

Had them lifted up.  The youngest wanted Bensurdatu to go before her, fearing the generals' treachery, but he refused; she pledged that she would marry no one else.  Then the generals did not lower the rope for him and threatened the princesses, to make them say that they had rescued them.  Believing the lie, the king agreed to marry the two oldest to the generals.

One morning, Bensurdatu noticed a purse.  When he took it down, it asked him what demands he had for his rescue.  He had it bring him to the surface and give him a ship.  He sailed to the king's city.  The king wanted to marry him to his youngest daughter, but she refused.  He asked if she would say the same if he were Bensurdatu.  She said nothing, and he told his story.  The king exiled the generals and married Bensurdatu to his youngest daughter.

Analysis
Soon after he developed his classification of folktales, Finnish folklorist Antti Aarne published, in 1912, a study on the collections of the Brothers Grimm, Austrian consul Johann Georg von Hahn, Danish folklorist Svend Grundtvig, Swiss scholar Laura Gonzenbach and Alexander Afanasyev. According to this primary system, developed in 1910, the tale fits type 301, "The Three Stolen Princesses". This typing was corroborated by professor Jack Zipes, who also classified the tale as AaTh 301, "Quest for a Vanished Princess".

According to Reinhold Köhler's annotations on the tale, the story belongs to a Märchen cycle of a youth that rescues three princesses from their captivity in a subterranean realm and is betrayed by his companions. He soon finds another exit to the surface, reveals his companions' deceit and marries one of the princesses.

See also

Aladdin
Prâslea the Brave and the Golden Apples
Soria Moria Castle
The Bird 'Grip'
The Bold Knight, the Apples of Youth, and the Water of Life
The Brown Bear of the Green Glen
The Golden Bird
The Golden Mermaid
The King Of Lochlin's Three Daughters
The Rider Of Grianaig, And Iain The Soldier's Son
The Tinder Box

References

External links
The Story of Bensurdatu

Italian fairy tales
Fictional servants
ATU 300-399
Laura Gonzenbach